

English language

Arabic 
Global Arabic Encyclopedia (1996)
Arab Encyclopedia (1998)

Azeri 
Azerbaijani Soviet Encyclopedia (1976)

Belorussian 
Byelorussian Soviet Encyclopedia (1969)

Catalan 
Gran Enciclopèdia Catalana (1968)

Croatian 
General Encyclopedia of the Yugoslav Lexicographical Institute (1977)
Croatian Encyclopedia (1999)

Czech 
Masarykův slovník naučný (7 volumes, 1925–1933)
B. Kočího Malý slovník naučný (2 volumes, 1925–1929, online)
Nový velký ilustrovaný Slovník naučný (22 volumes, 1929–1934, online)
Komenského slovník naučný (10 volumes, 1937–1938)
Příruční slovník naučný (PSN, 4 volumes, 1962–1967)
Malý encyklopedický slovník A-Ž (1 volume, 1972)
Ilustrovaný encyklopedický slovník (IES, 3 volumes, 1980–1982)
Malá československá encklopedie (MČSE, 6 volumes, 1984–1987)
Diderot (8 volumes, 1999–2000)
Universum (10 volumes, 1999–2001)
Czech Wikipedia (2002–)

Danish 
Den Store Danske Encyklopædi (1994)

Dutch 
Oosthoek (1907)
Eerste Nederlandse Systematisch Ingerichte Encyclopaedie (1946)
Grote Nederlandse Larousse Encyclopedie (1971)
Grote Spectrum Encyclopedie (1974)

Finnish 
Tietosanakirja (1909)
Pieni tietosanakirja (1925)
Uusi tietosanakirja (1960)
Facta (1969)

French 
Petit Larousse (1905)
Nouvelle Encyclopédie autodidactique illustrée d'enseignement moderne (1922)
Encyclopédie française (1935)
Grand Larousse encyclopédique (1960)
Encyclopedie universelle (1961)
Encyclopedie Internationale Focus (1963)
Quid  (1963)
Encyclopædia Universalis (1966)
Grand Dictionnaire Encyclopédique Larousse (1982)

Georgian 
Georgian Soviet Encyclopedia (1965)

German 
Habbels Konversations-Lexikon (1912)
Meyers Blitz-Lexikon (1924)
Der Kleine Beckmann (1927)
Jedermann's Lexikon (1929)

Greek 
Great Greek Encyclopedia (1926)
Helios (1945)

Gujarati 
Bhagavadgomandal (1940)
Gujarati Vishwakosh (1985)

Hebrew 
Encyclopaedia Hebraica (1948)

Icelandic 
Icelandic Encyclopedia A-Ö (1990)

Italian 
Chirone : piccola enciclopedia metodica italiana (1914)
Enciclopedia Italiana di Scienze, Lettere ed Arti (1929)
Enciclopedia Disney (1970)

Japanese 
Heibonsha World Encyclopedia (1988)

Kazakh 
Kazakh Soviet Encyclopedia (1972)

Korean  
Doosan Encyclopedia (1982)

Kyrgyz 
Kyrgyz Soviet Encyclopedia (1976)

Latvian 
Latvian Soviet Encyclopedia (1981)

Marathi  
Maharashtriya Jnanakosha (1916)
Marathi Vishwakosh (1976)

Malayalam  
Sarvavijnanakosam (1972)

Norwegian 
Norsk Allkunnebok (1948)
Pax Leksikon (1978)
Store norske leksikon (1978)

Persian 
Moin Encyclopedic Dictionary (1946)
The Persian Encyclopedia (1966)

Polish 
Wielka Encyklopedia Powszechna PWN (1962)
WIEM Encyklopedia (mid-1990s)

Portuguese 
Grande Enciclopédia Portuguesa e Brasileira (1936)
 Enciclopédia Barsa (1964)

Romanian 
Dicționar enciclopedic român (1962)

Russian 
Great Soviet Encyclopedia (1926)

Slovak 
Slovenský náučný slovník. (1932) 
Pyramída. (1971–1990)
Malá slovenská encyklopédia. (1993)
Encyclopaedia Beliana. (1999–)
Všeobecný encyklopedický slovník. (2002)
Slovak Wikipedia. (2003–)
Univerzum – všeobecná obrazová encyklopédia A - Ž. (2011)

Spanish 
Enciclopedia universal ilustrada europeo-americana (1908)
El Nuevo Tesoro de la Juventud (1975)
Great Aragonese Encyclopedia (1981)

Swedish 
Svensk uppslagsbok (1929)
Focus (1958)
Bra böckers lexikon (1973)
Nationalencyklopedin (1980)
Barnens lexikon (1981)

Tajik 
Tajik Soviet Encyclopedia (1978)

Tamil 
Tamil Encyclopedia (1954)

Turkish 
AnaBritannica (1986)

Uzbek 
Uzbek Soviet Encyclopedia (1971)

 
20th